Laldenga (11 June 1927 – 7 July 1990) was a Mizo nationalist and politician from Mizoram in northeast India. He was the founder of the Mizo National Front, a social organisation turned political party. He was the first Chief Minister of Mizoram as a federated state, the office of which he held from 1986 to 1988.

Originally a Havildar in the Indian Army, Laldenga later worked as an Accounts Clerk in the Government of Assam. Disappointed by the government's indifference to the severe famine in the Mizo district in the late 1950s, he rebelled against the government. As a leader of the Mizo National Front (MNF), he led a secessionist war seeking Mizo territory's independence from India. He was captured many times, and spent most of his time in exile in Bangladesh. The guerrilla movement lasted for sixteen years till the Mizo Accord was signed in 1986, by which he became the Chief Minister of the new state of Mizoram. He won the first Mizoram Legislative Assembly election under statehood in 1987, and continued at the Chief Minister office for another year. He died of lung cancer in 1990.

Early years 

Laldenga, the fourth child of a cultivator Liantlira Ralte and Darchhungi Hnamte, was born on 11 June 1927 in village Pukpui in the Mizo district of Assam (now in the Lunglei district of Mizoram). He joined the Indian Army in 1944 and served up to Havildar. He resigned from the army and joined civil service as Accounts Supervisor under District Council office in Aizawl.

Secessionist movements
Laldenga joined a voluntary organisation called Mizo Cultural Society, formed in 1955, as its Secretary. The society became Mautam Front in March 1960 to work for relief due to the Mautam famine that affected the entire Mizoram (which was then a district council of Assam). The government could not make efficient effort to provide basic survival needs, and this prompted the need for more powerful pressure group. The organisation was then renamed Mizo National Famine Front (MNFF) in September 1960. This soon evolved into a political organisation and ultimately became the Mizo National Front (MNF) on 22 October 1961. Laldenga took the support from Pakistan for the separatist movement and was arrested and jailed by Indian authorities. As an outcome of his talks, between 1963 and 1966 East Pakistan provided military training and shelter to Mizo fighters when they needed exile.

On the night of 28 February 1966, the MNF launched a daring and ambitious attack on the district's major towns, resulting in the March 1966 Mizo National Front uprising. It declared independence and called on the Mizos to rise against India. The Indian government responded by sending troops and aircraft on bombing missions. Villagers were uprooted from the hills and sent without their consent to what were called Regrouped Villages built along the highways. For the next 20 years, violence continued in the Mizo hills with the fighters camping in Mizoram (India) and East Pakistan. With the fall of East Pakistan in 1971, Laldenga's men scattered to Myanmar while he moved to Pakistan. After secret meetings in Europe with Indian officials, he returned seeking a peaceful resolution of the problem.

During his guerrilla life, Laldenga was arrested on several occasions and spent 10 years in exile, mostly in Bangladesh and Pakistan. He returned to India for peace talks in 1976, but the terms of negotiations failed in 1982. MNF was officially outlawed in January, and he, with some relatives, were arrested. He was extradited by the Indian government in April.

Peace Accord and last days

When Rajiv Gandhi became the Prime Minister of India in 1984, it encouraged a new wave of negotiation. Laldenga met him on 15 February 1985, and peace settlement was on its way. On 30 June 1986 the official document entitled Mizoram Accord, 1986, Memorandum of Settlement was then signed by Laldenga, R. D. Pradhan, Home Secretary, and Lalkhama, Chief secretary.

Laldenga became an interim Chief Minister, as the sitting Chief Minister Lalthanhawla stepped down to Deputy Chief Minister. Under the terms of the accord, Mizoram was granted statehood in February 1987. Laldenga and his party MNF won the first elections to the state legislature. Elected from Sateek and Aizawl North-II constituencies, he became the first Chief Minister of Mizoram as a federated state. However, defections toppled him from office in 1988.

Death 
Laldenga never rose to political arena again due to chronic lung cancer. In early 1990, he received medical treatments at the Memorial Sloan Kettering Cancer Center in New York City. After a three-month therapy, he headed home via England. Just after landing on the London airport, he died as he was taken to Ashford Hospital on 7 July 1990. His body was transported reached Aizawl on 11 July and was honoured with the first state funeral in Mizoram on 13 July, and buried at the centre of Aizawl city.

References

Further reading

Suhas Chatterjee (1994). Making of Mizoram: Role of Laldenga. M.D. Publications Pvt. Ltd, New Delhi.

External links
Feature on Laldenga in India Today
Photos of Laldenga's grave

1930s births
1990 deaths
Mizo people
Chief Ministers of Mizoram
Deaths from lung cancer in India
People from Lunglei district
Indian expatriates in Pakistan
Indian expatriates in Bangladesh
Mizo National Front politicians